Team Wiggins Le Col, also known as Team Wiggins in media, was a professional developmental cycling team based in the United Kingdom, which began competing in elite road bicycle racing and track cycling in 2015. The team folded at the end of the 2019 season after completing the Tour of Britain.

Team history

The team was founded by Bradley Wiggins, after much speculation in the latter part of the 2014 road season, in order to better facilitate his return to the track as part of his preparations for the 2016 Olympic Games.

The team has a reported budget of £460,000 which is comparable to JLT–Condor and Madison-Genesis. According to Cycling Weekly the team's management comprises Robert Dodds (president of XIX Entertainment, and Wiggins's manager), Andrew McQuaid (rider agent and director of Trinity Sports Management) and Wiggins himself. The team appointed former  DS Simon Cope as its first directeur sportif .

For the team's inaugural season the team began with eight full-time riders, with Wiggins joining on 1 May 2015. Those eight were Steven Burke, Mark Christian, Jonathan Dibben, Owain Doull, Daniel Patten, Iain Paton, Andy Tennant and Michael Thompson. These eight riders are supplemented by riders from the British Academy on a race to race basis. On 5 January 2015 the team was officially awarded its UCI Continental licence.

In March 2015, Bradley Wiggins confirmed that he would make his debut with the team at the inaugural Tour de Yorkshire at the start of May. In 2016, he entered the Tour De Yorkshire with his team and dropped out in the first stage. WIGGINS was not invited to the 2017 Tour de Yorkshire. In 2018 following the collapse of Team Aqua Blue Sport, Team Wiggins participated at short notice in the 2018 Tour of Britain. Tom Pidcock was the team's highest placed rider in the race at 17th in the General Classification.

In November 2018 the team filed paperwork with Companies House which indicated that XIX Entertainment no longer held a 40 percent stake in the team, and that this share had been transferred to Wiggins' firm, Wiggins Right Limited.

In August 2019, Wiggins announced that the team would closing down at the end of the year.

Sponsorship

Sky, along with British Cycling, will sponsor and support the team. The team's kit was initially produced by Rapha. but as of 2018 the team switched to use Le Col as their clothing supplier. In December 2018 Wiggins announced that Le Col would step up to becoming the team's co-title sponsor for 2019, with the team being known as Team Wiggins Le Col. The team use Pinarello bikes equipped with Zipp, Fizik, Elite and SRAM components.

Final roster

Major wins

2015
 Wiltshire GP, Andy Tennant
 Stage 2 Flèche du Sud, Andy Tennant
 Stages 3 & 4 Flèche du Sud, Owain Doull
 Round 6 – Barrow Tour Series, Christopher Lawless
 Points classification Tour of Britain, Owain Doull
2016
 Stage 3a (ITT) Le Triptyque des Monts et Châteaux, Jonathan Dibben
 Stage 4 Ronde de l'Isard, Scott Davies
 Stage 5 Olympia's Tour, Christopher Latham
2017
 Klondike Grand Prix, Christopher Latham
2018
 Volta ao Alentejo
Stages 1 & 6, Gabriel Cullaigh
Youth Classification, Mark Downey
 Rutland–Melton International CiCLE Classic, Gabriel Cullaigh
 Stage 2 Giro della Valle d'Aosta, Mark Donovan
  Mountains classification Le Triptyque des Monts et Chateaux, James Fouché
2019
 Tour of Antalya
 Mountain classification, James Fouché
Intermediate sprints classification, James Fouché
 Volta ao Alentejo
Stage 3, Gabriel Cullaigh
 Mountains classification, James Fouché
 Triptyque des Monts et Châteaux
 Points classification, Thomas Pidcock
Stage 2b, Thomas Pidcock
 Paris–Roubaix Espoirs, Thomas Pidcock
  Overall Tour Alsace, Thomas Pidcock
 Young rider classification, Thomas Pidcock
Stage 2, Thomas Pidcock

National, continental and world champions
2015
  British U23 Road Race, Owain Doull
  British Track (Individual pursuit), Andy Tennant
  UEC European Track (Team pursuit) Bradley Wiggins
2016
  World Track (Points race), Jonathan Dibben
  World Track (Madison), Bradley Wiggins
  British U23 Time Trial, Scott Davies
  Olympic Games (Team pursuit), Steven Burke, Owain Doull & Bradley Wiggins
  Olympic Games (Team Sprint), Philip Hindes
2017
  British U23 Time Trial, Scott Davies
2018
  British U23 Road Race, Robert Scott
  New Zealand U23 Road Race, James Fouché
  Irish U23 Time Trial, Michael O'Loughlin
2019
  New Zealand Road Race, James Fouché
  New Zealand U23 Road Race, James Fouché
  New Zealand U23 Time Trial, James Fouché
  Irish U23 Time Trial, Michael O'Loughlin

See also

References

External links

Cycling teams based in the United Kingdom
UCI Continental Teams (Europe)
Cycling teams established in 2015
2015 establishments in the United Kingdom
Defunct cycling teams based in the United Kingdom